"If You Ever Want to Be in Love" is a song by English singer-songwriter James Bay. It was released in the United Kingdom on 29 October 2015 through Republic Records as the fourth single from his debut studio album Chaos and the Calm (2014) after originally being included on Bay's 2014 Let It Go EP. The single was certified gold in the United Kingdom in April 2022.

Background
Bay told PopCrush the song is "about a few different experiences and scenarios" saying "I was really keen to [move away from home] when I was 18, and I moved about 2-3 hours away ... Suddenly, I was really aware of the feeling every time I went home back to the town where I grew up in. When [I'd see my home town friends] again, there was always that talk of we're all back in this town -- it was a small town. We'd come together and one of the stories amongst all of this is always, "I saw that girl who I had something going on with and it really it sort of fizzled out and didn't end up being anything because we both went to different parts of the country." Some people have that feeling of "what if?" and that slight feeling of regret that they moved away. So the song is kind of referencing that whole part of your life where you leave and whenever you come back to visit, there's those things that make you think "What if I hadn't left?" There's those reminders, maybe still there. Or maybe you've come back to visit as well and it's kind of about chance meeting between two people who started from the same place, went away and came back again."

Music video 
A music video to accompany the release of "If You Ever Want to Be in Love" was first released onto YouTube on 29 October 2015 at a total length of four minutes and forty-three seconds. 
The clip was directed by Sophie Mueller and sees Bay performing in a small venue not dissimilar from the pubs and clubs he was playing before the album's release.

Charts

Weekly charts

Year-end charts

Certifications

Release history

References 

2015 singles
2014 songs
Republic Records singles
James Bay (singer) songs
Songs written by James Bay (singer)
Song recordings produced by Jacquire King
Songs written by Jimmy Hogarth